Tomorrow You're Gone, also known as Boot Tracks, is a 2012 crime thriller film directed by David Jacobson.

Cast
 Stephen Dorff as Charlie Rankin
 Michelle Monaghan as Florence Jane
 Willem Dafoe as The Buddha
 Tara Buck as Blonde Mistress
 Robert LaSardo as Ornay Corale
 Kerry Rossall as Chaney

Reception 
On Rotten Tomatoes, it has an approval rating of 7% based on reviews from 15 critics, with an average rating of 3.70/10. Metacritic, which uses a weighted average, assigned a score of 19 out of 100 based on 5 critics, indicating "overwhelming dislike".

References

External links
 

2012 films
Films directed by David Jacobson
2010s English-language films